Orlando Beltran Quevedo (born 11 March 1939) is a Filipino prelate of the Catholic Church. A cardinal since 2014, he was Archbishop of Cotabato from 1998 to 2018. He became a bishop in 1980.

Early life
Orlando Beltran Quevedo was born on 11 March 1939, in Laoag, Ilocos Norte. Beginning in 1945, he attended grades 1 to 3 in Laoag Shamrock School, and finished grades 4 to 6 in Marbel Central Elementary School in Marbel, South Cotabato, graduating in 1950. He attended Notre Dame High School in Marbel from 1950 to 1954.

Priesthood
Quevedo studied at San José Seminary from 1954 to 1956, but spent his novitiate in St. Peter's Novitiate in Mission, Texas. He earned his degree in Philosophy from San José Seminary in 1960, and in 1964 received his S.T.B. and MA in Religious Education from Oblate College (Catholic University of America) in Washington, D.C. He was ordained a priest of the Missionary Oblates of Mary Immaculate on 5 June 1964.

In 1964, he was assigned assistant parish priest of Cotabato Cathedral,

Episcopacy
Quevedo was appointed Bishop-Prelate of Kidapawan by Pope John Paul II on 28 October 1980. Upon the prelature's elevation to diocese, he assumed the title Bishop of Kidapawan.

On 22 March 1986, he was named Archbishop of Nueva Segovia in Ilocos Sur, and on 30 May 1998, he was named Archbishop of Cotabato.

Cardinal
On 12 January 2014, Pope Francis named Quevedo as one of 19 men to be inducted into the College of Cardinals in the consistory of 22 February 2014, with the titular church of Santa Maria "Regina Mundi" a Torre Spaccata. He is the first cardinal from Mindanao and, until his 80th birthday, the second Filipino cardinal-elector, along with Luis Antonio Tagle, Archbishop of Manila.  Pope Francis named him member in Pontifical Council for Justice and Peace and Pontifical Council for Inter-religious Dialogue.

On 6 November 2018, Pope Francis accepted Quevedo's resignation as archbishop.

Cardinal Quevedo ceased to be a cardinal-elector on his 80th birthday.

Other posts
In 1994 Quevedo received the most votes for election to the General Council of the Secretariat of the Synod of Bishops in Rome.
 
Quevedo is a former secretary-general of the Federation of Asian Bishops' Conferences and former president of the Catholic Bishops' Conference of the Philippines.

See also
Cardinals created by Francis

References

External links
 
Orlando Quevedo
CBCP Online (official profile)
"Quevedo red hat boosts hope for local church"  National Catholic Reporter, 14 January 2014

1939 births
Living people
Cardinals created by Pope Francis
Filipino cardinals
People from Laoag
People from South Cotabato
Missionary Oblates of Mary Immaculate
Members of the Pontifical Council for Justice and Peace
Members of the Pontifical Council for Interreligious Dialogue
20th-century Roman Catholic bishops in the Philippines
21st-century Roman Catholic archbishops in the Philippines
Roman Catholic archbishops of Nueva Segovia
Roman Catholic archbishops of Cotabato
Presidents of the Catholic Bishops' Conference of the Philippines